The Javier Prado Avenue is one of the main avenues of Lima, capital of Peru. By its length it is the second largest avenue of the city, after the Universitaria Avenue. It goes from west to east, going through the districts of Magdalena del Mar, San Isidro, Lince, La Victoria, San Borja, Santiago de Surco, Ate and La Molina along 135 blocks.

It is divided into two segments: East Javier Prado from the Arequipa Avenue until its end in the Ate District (This last section is called Prolongación Javier Prado) with a total of 101 blocks, and West Javier Prado from the Arequipa Avenue until its beginning in the Brasil Avenue in the Magdalena del Mar district, with a total of 34 blocks. The Arequipa Avenue is used as a point of separation of both segments.

Its name comes from the Peruvian philosopher Javier Prado, son of the President Mariano Ignacio Prado, who governed Peru during the War of the Pacific. Javier Prado, however, was a relevant political figure at the beginning of the 20th century, he even ended up being the Rector of the National University of San Marcos.

The Javier Prado Avenue is the fourth most congested street in Lima, and has 29 public transport routes using it.

Trivia 
 In 1968, the Mayor of Lima Luis Bedoya Reyes built the first phase of the Luis Bedoya Reyes Avenue, which ended in the Javier Prado Avenue.

References 

Javier Prado